Tuinal was the brand name of a discontinued combination drug composed of two barbiturate salts (secobarbital sodium and amobarbital sodium) in equal proportions.

Tuinal was introduced as a sedative-hypnotic (sleeping pill) medication in the late 1940s by Eli Lilly. It was also used in obstetrics for childbirth. It was produced in brightly colored half-reddish orange and half-turquoise blue gelatin capsule form (bullet-shaped Pulvules) for oral administration. Individual capsules contained 50 mg, 100 mg, or 200 mg of barbiturate salts. The combination of a short-acting barbiturate, Secobarbital, with an intermediate-acting barbiturate, Amobarbital, aimed to provide "a rapid yet prolonged hypnotic action".

Eli Lilly has discontinued the manufacture of Tuinal in the United States due to the diminishing use of barbiturates (replaced by the benzodiazepine family of drugs) in outpatient treatment, and its widespread abuse. Currently, Valleant Labs markets Secobarbital capsules only. Flynn Pharma of Ireland no longer manufactures Tuinal, Seconal or Amytal (amobarbital). Amytal has been discontinued, though sodium amytal injection form remains.

Abuse

Tuinal saw widespread abuse as a recreational drug from the 1960s through the 1980s. The pill was known colloquially under the street names "tuies", "tumies", "double trouble", "blue tips", " F-66's" (which were the markings on Lilly's capsule), "rainbows", "beans", "nawls" and "jeebs". It came in the form of bullet-shaped capsules, half-reddish orange and half-turquoise blue. Like other barbiturate depressants, Tuinal promotes physical and psychological dependency beginning after one week of regular use and carries a high risk of overdose. It was reported in the 1980s as one of the most common ways of self-poisoning. Abuse of this particular drug tapered off after it was discontinued by manufacturers in the late 1990s.

Tuinal is classified as a Schedule II drug under the Controlled Substances Act in the United States, meaning it requires a prescription from a licensed practitioner.

Arthur Koestler and his wife Cynthia jointly committed suicide on March 1, 1983, by swallowing lethal quantities of Tuinal capsules at their London home.

Popular culture references

Fiction
 Oscar Levant wrote in his book The Unimportance of Being Oscar, "If I had the choice between the most beautiful girl in the world and three grams of Tuonol [sic], I would take the latter."
 In Ian Fleming's short story "The Living Daylights" (published in Octopussy and The Living Daylights, 1966) Commander Bond takes the drug before an assault on a KGB sniper: "He selected the Tuinal, chased down two of the ruby and blue depth-charges with a glass of water, and went back to bed. Then, poleaxed, he slept."
 In Andrew Holleran's novel Dancer from the Dance (1978), a case of overdose in a discotheque is mentioned: "The boy passed out on the sofa from an overdose of Tuinols [sic] was a Puerto Rican who washed dishes in the employees' cafeteria at CBS, but the doctor bending over him had treated presidents."
 In a scene from the Stephen King novel Pet Sematary (1983), the main character, Dr. Louis Creed, swallows a Tuinal to calm himself down. Creed then recalls a friend from medical school with a particular fondness for Tuinal, which the friend dubbed "the Toonerville trolley", or "tooners" for short.
 In Don Winslow's novel, The Power of the Dog (2005), one of the main characters, "Nora", is given Tuinal to put her to sleep.

Poetry
In John Betjeman's poem "Shattered Image" (1970), an accused child molestor wonders how many of his Tuinal—used, presumably, as a recreational depressant—it will take to kill himself.
In Grace Paley's poem "On the Fourth Floor", a boy screams to his girl that of sixteen Tuinal, he cannot account for two.

Music and musicians
On the afternoon of June 30, 1995, six days before her 46th birthday, Singer Phyllis Hyman died by suicide by overdosing on a mixture of Tuinal and vodka in the bedroom of her New York City apartment at 211 West 56th Street. She was found unconscious at 2:00 p.m. (EDT) and died at 3:50 p.m. at St. Luke's-Roosevelt Hospital (now Mount Sinai West) hours before she was scheduled to perform at the Apollo Theater.

In the Van Halen history Van Halen Rising Valerie Evans Noel is quoted: "Ludes, Tuinals, and Seconals were all the rage”. (Describing the scene at early Van Halen gigs at The Rock Corporation in LA). The book recalls one night, “when she played rock-paper-scissors with Edward (Van Halen) for a tuinol [sic]”. 

Gram Parsons, the late American singer/songwriter, formerly of The Flying Burrito Brothers, used to wear a Nudie jacket, created by Manual Cuevas, which contained graphic representations of Tuinal capsules. The jacket appears on the cover of the LP The Gilded Palace of Sin.

In "The Old Main Drag", a song from The Pogues' 1985 album Rum, Sodomy, and the Lash, the drug is name-checked: "In the cold winter nights, the old town it was chill / But there were boys in the cafes who'd give you cheap pills / If you didn't have the money, you'd cajole or you'd beg / There was always lots of tuinol [sic] on the old main drag."

In the Hawkwind song "Lost Johnny", the drug appears in the verse "We're all taking Tuinal to murder our young dreams". Later, when Motörhead performed the song, the verse became "We're all shooting Tuinal to murder all your dreams". 

In The Ramones song "Psycho Therapy", Joey Ramone sings in the second verse "I like taking Tuinal / It keeps me edgy and mean / I'm a teenage schizoid / I'm a teenage dope fiend". 

In the book Please Kill Me: The Uncensored Oral History of Punk (1996), Eliot Kidd refers to Sid Vicious taking "about thirty Tuinals" (a lethal dose for someone that doesn't have a huge tolerance to barbiturates) at the Chelsea Hotel in New York, the night Nancy Spungen was found stabbed to death and for which Sid was charged with her murder. In the same book, Ronnie Cutrone describes Tuinal abuse as having been standard practice for the Doors' singer Jim Morrison.

The Queers song "Feeling So Groovy" has the verse "I'm really not that dumb you know / got lots of beer and Tuinals".

In the Lou Reed song "New Sensations", he sings: "It's easy enough to tell what is wrong, but that's not what I want to hear all night long, some people are like human Tuinals."

The W.A.S.P song "Doctor Rockter" includes the lyrics: "Cocaine, Codeine, 714, a Tuinal blindfold just what I need."

American writer/poet/singer Jim Carroll is reputed to be the voice heard asking Brigid Polk about the availability of Tuinals between songs on The Velvet Underground's Live at Max's Kansas City album.

On the television series Behind the Music (on VH1), the rock band Aerosmith mentioned Tuinal and Seconal as two of the primary drugs that members of the band abused in the 1970s and 1980s.

In singer-songwriter Anthony Kiedis' memoir Scar Tissue, he mentions "melting tuinals in a spoon" (unsuccessfully) and attempting to inject them.

In Keith Richards' book Life (page 5), he mentions "In the cap's pockets there's hash, Tuinals and some coke".

Saint Vitus's 2012 album Lillie: F-65 is named after Tuinal, the 100 mg capsules were marked F-65.

In Tarkio's song "Standing Still", Colin Meloy sings about "an eight ball and tuinal". 

The song "Venus Stopped the Train" by the band Wilco (and issued on Jay Bennett's post-Wilco album with Edward Burch, The Palace at 4 a.m. (Part 1)), contains the lyric: "Smoking grass and taking Christmas trees / She fell in love with me", the "Christmas trees" referencing one of Tuinal's many street names.

In Ray Wylie Hubbard's "Mother's Blues", he sings about his beautiful stripper girlfriend who liked to drink tequila and take Tuinal, which led her to pawn his Gold Top Gibson Les Paul guitar.

Film and Television
In the 1991 film Mortal Thoughts, Bruce Willis asks Glenne Headly for money and Tuinal.
In the movie Taxi Driver (1976), the gun dealer Easy Andy (Steven Prince) offers Travis Bickle (Robert De Niro) Tuinal.
In the 1986 movie Sid and Nancy,  Sid Vicious and his girlfriend Nancy can be seen buying and shooting up Tuinal (which is incorrectly said to be speed in the movie).
In the movie Fight Club (1999), Jack's narration refers to "red and blue Tuinals" when he sees the doctor about his insomnia.
In the movie Where the Truth Lies (2005)—set in both 1957 and 1972—there are many on-screen examples of Tuinal consumption - often with alcohol. Tuinals were taken by the leading characters (loosely based upon a Martin & Lewis-like comedy team, Lanny Morris and Vince Collins) and by the leading female characters and contributed to significant plot advances. Some dialogue justifies the use of pills like Tuinal because they weren't as bad as injection drugs, thus "didn't count".
In the 2011 movie My Week With Marilyn, during a scene in Marilyn Monroe's bedroom, a bottle of Tuinal (misspelled "Tunial") can be seen on the bedside table, in reference to her dependency on barbiturates.
In the 1998 film, Slums of Beverly Hills, Marisa Tomei's character asks Eliot if he has anything for her nerves "Seconal, Demerol, Tuinal, Valium, Quaaludes, Percocet..."
The first episode of Stranger Things sees Jim Hopper addicted to the red and blue Tuinal pills, before he decides to empty his entire vial after a first encounter with the creature that will come to be known as the Demogorgon.
In True Blood Season 7 Episode 3 Vampire James tells Lafayette that the last pill he took before becoming a vampire was Tuinal.
In ''[Where the Truth Lies]], a 2005 movie, Kevin Bacon and Colin firth portray Lewis and Martin type characters and they speak often of "popping Tuinals" to keep going.

References

External links 
Dorland's Medical Dictionary: entry for Tuinal
Drugs.com entry for Tuinal

Barbiturates
Eli Lilly and Company brands
Combination drugs